Clostridium chromiireducens is a Gram-positive anaerobe anaerobic and spore-forming bacterium from the genus Clostridium which has been isolated from wetland soil from Michigan in the United States.

References

 

Bacteria described in 2011
chromiireducens